Cartland Bridge is a road bridge on the A73 north-west of Lanark, South Lanarkshire which spans the Mouse Water, a tributary of the River Clyde. The three-span bridge was built in 1822, to designs by the engineer Thomas Telford. It is notable for being the highest bridge over inland water in Scotland. It is a category B listed building.

References

External links

Lanark
Category B listed buildings in South Lanarkshire
Listed bridges in Scotland
Road bridges in Scotland
Bridges completed in 1822
Bridges by Thomas Telford
Crossings of Mouse Water
1822 establishments in Scotland